Kotogaume Tsuyoshi (born 5 October 1963 as Satoru Kitayama) is a former sumo wrestler from Yatsuo, Nei District, Toyama Prefecture, Japan. He joined sumo in 1979 and made the top makuuchi division in 1985. His highest rank was sekiwake, which he held on twelve occasions. After his retirement in 1997 he worked as a coach at Sadogatake stable until 2007.

Career
In his youth he practiced judo and was a black belt, 1st dan. He made his professional sumo debut in March 1979, after finishing junior high school. Initially he fought under his own surname of Kitayama, before being given the shikona of Kotogaume ("Harp of the Plum"). In his early career he served as a tsukebito or personal attendant to ozeki Kotokaze. He made his first appearance in the titled sanyaku ranks of the top division in November 1985, the same tournament in which Kotokaze announced his retirement. He reached his highest rank of sekiwake for the first time in September 1986. In 1989 he came close to ozeki promotion by producing two double figure scores at sekiwake in July and September, but he fell short with only eight wins in November 1989. In his later career he suffered increasingly from diabetes and fell to the second jūryō division. He made his last appearance in makuuchi in January 1995 and retired in May 1997.

Kotogaume earned two gold stars for defeating yokozuna whilst ranked as a maegashira, and at sekiwake in May 1988 he was also the last man to defeat Chiyonofuji before the latter embarked on his 53 bout winning streak. He also received seven special prizes. His best result in a tournament was third place in January 1988, behind Asahifuji and Konishiki.

Retirement from sumo
Kotogaume became an elder of the Sumo Association upon his retirement, but he did not own permanent toshiyori elder stock and had to borrow from wrestlers still active. He used Terao's Shikoroyama name until 2002, and then switched to Dejima's Onaruto name, but had to leave the Sumo Association in November 2007 when it was needed by the retiring Buyuzan, a member of Dejima's stable.

After leaving sumo, he opened up a chankonabe restaurant in Tokyo, named Kotogaume. He has also worked as an assistant instructor at Shikoroyama stable.

Fighting style

Kotogaume throughout his career relied almost entirely on pushing and thrusting techniques, and seemed to have little interest in using his opponent's mawashi for throws. Oshi-dashi, a straightforward push out, was the kimarite used in exactly half of his victories at sekitori level.

Career record

See also
Glossary of sumo terms
List of sumo tournament second division champions
List of past sumo wrestlers
List of sekiwake

References

External links

1963 births
Living people
Japanese sumo wrestlers
People from Toyama (city)
Sumo people from Toyama Prefecture
Sekiwake
Sadogatake stable sumo wrestlers